The SR.N2 was a hovercraft built by Westland and Saunders-Roe. It first flew in 1961. It weighed 27 tons and could carry 48 passengers. Although only one was built it is regarded as the prototype for commercial hovercraft, following on from the SR.N1 research craft. It was demonstrated on the Saint Lawrence River, Canada in 1962 and operated by P & A Campbell as a ferry crossing the Bristol Channel between Weston-super-Mare and Penarth in 1963. It was then fitted with deeper (4 ft) skirts to improve its performance in rough seas. Southdown Motor Services and Westland Aircraft ran the SR.N2 on the Solent between Eastney and Ryde in 1963/4, carrying 30,000 passengers. It was eventually broken up.

SR.N2 Specifications Bartie's Hovercraft

Notes and references

External links
 Hovercraft of Saunders-Roe - Bartie's Hovercraft
 SR.N2 - Hovercraft Museum
 BHC SRN2 Hovercraft - James' Hovercraft Site
 "SR.N2 - Stepping-Stone to the Economical Hovercraft" a 1962 Flight article by Bill Gunston

Saunders-Roe
Hovercraft